Sergej Barbarez (born 17 September 1971) is a Bosnian former professional footballer who played as a forward. Barbarez played for several clubs in the German Bundesliga and the Bosnia and Herzegovina national team. He is considered one of the all-time great players of Hamburger SV where he scored 65 goals in 174 Bundesliga games. Mainly used as a second striker, he also played as an attacking midfielder or left winger.

In the 2000–01 Bundesliga season while playing for Hamburger SV, Barbarez was joint top scorer with 22 goals with Ebbe Sand of Schalke 04 at the end of the season.

Early life
Barbarez was born in Mostar, SR Bosnia and Herzegovina, SFR Yugoslavia, present-day Bosnia and Herzegovina to a Bosnian Serb father and a half-Croat and half-Bosniak mother.

As a young child, he was actually not very interested in football but in basketball and athletics. However, at the age of eleven, Barbarez started playing football though mostly for fun with friends after school.

Club career

In 1984, Barbarez took a step further and started playing football for the youth team of Velež in his native city of Mostar.

Some six years later, he signed with the first team of Velež at the age of 19. However, briefly after, Barbarez served in the Yugoslav People's Army in Zagreb in 1991 before returning to Mostar to continue his career. In 1991, he returned to Velež and soon after everyone realized that Barbarez was a true talent.

The same year, he visited his uncle who was living in Germany. Some time later, Barbarez was preparing to return to Mostar but his uncle surprised him by extending his stay in Germany for two weeks. The uncle had arranged for him a two weeks try-out practise with Hannover 96. The coach of Hannover 96 was so impressed by Barbarez that he signed him for the club. During those same two weeks the political situation throughout former Yugoslavia was deteriorating by the minute and fighting was even occurring in some places. So Barbarez came to an agreement with his father to stay with his uncle in Germany for the near future.

In April 1992, the Bosnian War escalated in the city of Mostar. A month prior of the actual war, the father and sister of Barbarez fled with his high school sweetheart Ana to the city of Hanover in Germany. His mother Zlata stayed in Mostar throughout the whole war.

Barbarez played for Hannover 96 during the second half of the 1991–92 and the whole 1992–93 season. Between 1993 and 1996, he played for Union Berlin at the third level before signing with Hansa Rostock. Barbarez played there between 1996 and 1998.

In 1998, he signed with Borussia Dortmund and played there until joining Hamburger SV in July 2000.

During the first season with Hamburger SV, Barbarez became the top scorer for his club with 22 goals and joint top scorer of the Bundesliga with Ebbe Sand. Though, he could not help Hamburg's elimination from the 2000–01 UEFA Champions League at the group stages despite his two goals, when the club qualified for that competition for the first time, after a third place in the previous domestic Bundesliga season.

On 17 May 2006, Barbarez signed a two-year deal with Bayer Leverkusen. He finished his career at Bayer after his contract with the club expired in June 2008.

International career
 

On 14 May 1998, Barbarez made his debut for the Bosnia and Herzegovina national team against Argentina in a friendly match.

Barbarez scored two goals against Liechtenstein in a World Cup qualification match on 28 March 2001. He was denied a hat-trick as his second-half penalty was saved by Lichtenstein goalkeeper Peter Jehle.

Before he retired from international football on 13 October 2005, Barbarez was the captain and leader of the Bosnian national team.

On 2 December 2005, he announced his comeback to the national team and played in the UEFA Euro 2008 qualifiers. He became captain of the team once again.

On 12 October 2006, Barbarez officially stepped down from playing for the Bosnia and Herzegovina national team and retired permanently from professional football in June 2008. His final international was an October 2006 European Championship qualification match against Moldova.

Coaching career
Barbarez announced on 14 December 2009 that he wanted to be the head coach of the Bosnia and Herzegovina national football team in the UEFA Euro 2012 qualifiers. However, the Football Association of Republika Srpska blocked his entry and later on, Safet Sušić was selected as the new head coach of the Bosnia and Herzegovina national team.

On 5 January 2011, Barbarez received his UEFA Pro Licence in the Football Association of Bosnia and Herzegovina's educational facility in Jablanica.

Personal life
Barbarez is married to his high-school sweetheart Ana, who is also from Mostar. They have two sons together, Filip-André (born 1994) and Sergio-Luis (1999). Barbarez was a member of the board of directors of Hamburger SV between 25 January 2009 and 28 May 2010.

Career statistics

Club

International goals
Scores and results list Bosnia and Herzegovina's goal tally first, score column indicates score after each Barbarez goal.

Honours

Player
Hamburger SV 
DFB-Ligapokal: 2003
UEFA Intertoto Cup: 2005

Individual
Awards
Bosnian Footballer of the Year: 2001, 2002, 2003

Performance
Bundesliga Top Goalscorer: 2000–01 (22 goals)

References

 Connelly, Charlie (2002) Stamping Grounds: Exploring Liechtenstein and Its World Cup Dreams. Abacus.

External links

1971 births
Living people
Sportspeople from Mostar
Association football midfielders
Association football forwards
Bosnia and Herzegovina footballers
Bosnia and Herzegovina international footballers
FK Velež Mostar players
Hannover 96 players
1. FC Union Berlin players
FC Hansa Rostock players
Borussia Dortmund players
Hamburger SV players
Bayer 04 Leverkusen players
Bundesliga players
2. Bundesliga players
Regionalliga players
Bosnia and Herzegovina expatriate footballers
Expatriate footballers in Germany
Bosnia and Herzegovina expatriate sportspeople in Germany
Kicker-Torjägerkanone Award winners
Bosnia and Herzegovina people of Serbian descent 
Bosnia and Herzegovina people of Croatian descent 
Bosnia and Herzegovina people of Bosniak descent